Thrikkadavoor Sivaraju ( 1973) is an elephant from southern Kerala owned by Travancore Devaswom. At an height of 311  cm, Sivaraju is one of the tallest living elephants in Asia.

Sivaraju is an elephant with the body structure that is mentioned in mathangaleela(Book of elephants ). He is having a massive ear structure that makes sivaraju different and beautiful from other elephants.In February 2020, Sivaraju received an amount of Rs 3,19,000 for chathinamkulam Festival, which was the highest amount of money that an elephant can get for a festival in Kerala. This record was previously held by Gajarajan Guruvayur Padmanabhan, who received the highest donation fee in 2004.

See also
 List of individual elephants

References

1973 animal births
Individual elephants
Elephants in Indian culture
Individual animals in India
Elephants in Hinduism
Elephants in Kerala